Azaad Liadi (born 14 May 1998) is an American soccer player who plays as a winger for Huntsville City FC in MLS Next Pro.

Career

College
Liadi attended Saginaw Valley State University for three years, making 56 appearances and scoring 11 goals for their varsity soccer team. For his senior year, Liadi transferred to Georgia Southern University. He would go on to make 16 appearances, scoring three goals. During college, Liadi spent a season in the NPSL with AFC Ann Arbor, and a season in USL League Two with the Cincinnati Dutch Lions.

FC Tucson
In March 2020, Liadi signed a professional contract with FC Tucson of USL League One. He made his competitive debut for the club on 25 July 2020 against Fort Lauderdale CF.

South Georgia Tormenta
On December 17, 2020, Liadi made the move to USL League One side South Georgia Tormenta ahead of their 2021 season.

Loudoun United
On January 28, 2022, it was announced Liadi had signed with USL Championship side Loudoun United. On February 26, 2022, Liadi joined Loudoun's parent club D.C. United on a 4-day emergency loan.

References

External links
Azaad Liadi at Georgia Southern Athletics

Georgia Southern Eagles men's soccer players
AFC Ann Arbor players
Cincinnati Dutch Lions players
FC Tucson players
Tormenta FC players
Loudoun United FC players
D.C. United players
National Premier Soccer League players
USL League Two players
USL League One players
MLS Next Pro players
American soccer players
Association football forwards
Soccer players from Michigan
1998 births
Living people
Sportspeople from Sterling Heights, Michigan
Saginaw Valley State Cardinals men's soccer players
American people of Nigerian descent